Balston's pygmy perch (Nannatherina balstoni), also known as Balston's perchlet, or king river perchlet, is a species of temperate perch endemic to Southwest Australia, where it occurs in coastal streams, ponds, lakes, and swamps.  It prefers shallow, acidic waters with patches of sedge growth.  This species can reach  SL, though most do not exceed .  It can also be found in the aquarium trade.

References

Percichthyidae
Taxonomy articles created by Polbot
Fish described in 1906
Endemic fauna of Southwest Australia
Monotypic fish genera